St. Patrick's Farm is a historic barn and farm complex located in Clay Township, St. Joseph County, Indiana.  The barn was built about 1925, and is a large, "T"-plan, multi-story, high gambrel roofed frame building. It is sheathed in shiplap siding and has two attached wood silos with conical roofs. Also on the property are the contributing concrete silo, gas pump, windmill, pole barn, and a fenced lot.  The farm was originally developed by the Sisters of the Holy Cross, then converted to a park in 1966.

It was listed on the National Register of Historic Places in 2013.

References

Farms on the National Register of Historic Places in Indiana
Buildings and structures completed in 1873
Buildings and structures in St. Joseph County, Indiana
National Register of Historic Places in St. Joseph County, Indiana